Pribislav was Prince of the Serbs for a year, in 891–892, before being deposed by his cousin Petar. He was the eldest son of Mutimir (r. 851–891) of the Vlastimirović dynasty, who ruled during the expanding and Christianization of Serbia.

Life

His father had with his brothers Strojimir and Gojnik, defeated the Bulgar Army sent by Tsar Boris I of Bulgaria and led by his son Vladimir. Vladimir was captured together with 12 boyars. Boris I and Mutimir agreed on peace (and perhaps an alliance), and Mutimir sent his sons Bran and Stefan beyond the border to escort the prisoners, where they exchanged items as a sign of peace: Boris himself gave them "rich gifts", while he was given "two slaves, two falcons, two dogs, and eighty furs".

In the 880s, Mutimir seized the throne, exiling his younger brothers and Klonimir, Strojimir's son, to the court of Boris I in the Bulgar Khanate. This was most likely due to treachery. Petar, the son of Gojnik, was kept at the Serbian court of Mutimir for political reasons, but he soon fled to Branimir of Croatia.

Mutimir died in 890 or 891, leaving the throne to his eldest son, Pribislav. Pribislav had only ruled for a year when Petar returned in 892, defeating him in battle and seizing the throne. Pribislav fled to Croatia with his brothers Bran and Stefan. Bran later returned and led an unsuccessful rebellion against Petar in 894. Bran was defeated, captured and blinded (a Byzantine tradition meant to disqualify a person from taking the throne)

His only son, Zaharija, remained in Constantinople for a long period before successfully seizing the throne with Byzantine aid, ruling from 922–924.

Legacy
The Pribislav mentioned in the Gospel of Cividale (codex aquileiensis), is most likely referring to Pribislav.

Notes

References

Sources

 
 
 
Ćorović, Vladimir, Istorija srpskog naroda, Book I, (In Serbian) Electric Book, Rastko Electronic Book, Antikvarneknjige (Cyrillic)
Drugi Period, IV: Pokrštavanje Južnih Slovena
 
 Ferjančić, B. 1997, "Basile I et la restauration du pouvoir byzantin au IXème siècle", Zbornik radova Vizantološkog instituta, no. 36, pp. 9–30.
 
 
 Tibor Živković, Portreti srpskih vladara (IX—XII), Beograd, 2006, p. 11
 
 Vizantološki institut SANU (Božidar Ferjančić), „Vizantijski izvori za istoriju naroda Jugoslavije (II tom)“ (fototipsko izdanje originala iz 1957), Beograd 2007 
 

9th-century Serbian monarchs
9th-century rulers in Europe
Vlastimirović dynasty
Eastern Orthodox monarchs
Serbian exiles
9th-century births
Year of death unknown
Slavic warriors
Christian monarchs